The 3rd (East Prussian) Cuirassiers “Count Wrangel” were a heavy cavalry regiment of the Royal Prussian Army. Formed in 1717 as a dragoons unit, the regiment was reorganized as cuirassiers in 1818. The regiment fought in the Silesian Wars, the War of the Sixth Coalition, the Austro-Prussian War, the Franco-Prussian War and  World War I.

See also
List of Imperial German cavalry regiments

References

Cuirassiers of the Prussian Army
Military units and formations established in 1717
Military units and formations disestablished in 1919
1717 establishments in Prussia